Marymount may refer to:

Schools
 Marymount colleges, a group of colleges around the world founded by the Religious of the Sacred Heart of Mary (RSHM)

Australia
 Marymount College, Adelaide
 Marymount College, Gold Coast

Canada 
 Marymount Academy (Sudbury), Ontario
 Marymount Academy, Montreal, Quebec

Colombia 
 Marymount International School Barranquilla
 Marymount School Bogota, a school of the Religious of the Sacred Heart of Mary, Bogota
 Marymount School Medellin, a school of the Religious of the Sacred Heart of Mary, Medellin

Italy 
 Marymount International School of Rome
 Istituto Marymount Rome, a school of the Religious of the Sacred Heart of Mary, Rome

Hong Kong 
 Marymount Secondary School
 Marymount Primary School

United States 

 Loyola Marymount University, Los Angeles, California
 Marymount California University, California
 Marymount High School, Los Angeles, California
 Marymount College (Florida), former name of Lynn University
 Marymount College (Kansas), Salina, Kansas
 Marymount School, New York, Manhattan, New York
 Marymount College, Tarrytown, part of Fordham University, New York
 Marymount Manhattan College, Manhattan, New York
 Marymount University, Arlington, Virginia
 Marymount Military Academy, a former school in Parkland, Washington

Other places
 Marymount International School London, England
 Marymount School, Paris, France
 Marymount High School, Jamaica
 Marymount Cuernavaca, a school of the Religious of the Sacred Heart of Mary, Cuernavaca, Mexico
 Marymount Convent School, Singapore

Other uses
 Marymount, Bishan, a subzone within the town of Bishan, Singapore
 Marymount MRT station, a Mass Rapid Transit station that serves Marymount, Bishan

See also
 Marymount College (disambiguation)
 Mariemont (disambiguation)
 Mary Mount (disambiguation)